Signs of the Times is a monthly magazine originally published by Pacific Press, a Seventh-day Adventist publishing house.  Signs presents articles that are considered to be helpful in assisting readers to live in modern society.  The magazine focuses on life's-style issues, health articles and Christian devotional and other religious articles. From its historical roots, the magazine emphasizes the second coming of Christ to this earth and living such lives so as to be able to meet Jesus at His second coming.

The editor of the American edition is Marvin Moore.

Signs is also available as an Australian version also known as Signs of the Times published by Signs Publishing Company. The Australian editor is Lee Dunstan.

In South Africa the Southern Publishing Association published a South African edition until 1990. From 1990 - 2012, Dr Eric Webster served as manager/editor of Signs, publishing the magazine on behalf of the Southern African Union  Conference of Seventh-day Adventists (SAU). Webster retired at the end of 2012. Dr Gerald du Preez now serves as editor, with the management and publishing of Signs, South African edition, directly under the Communication Department of the SAU. Signs is published on a bi-monthly basis in South Africa.

All three publications collaborate on articles, layout and editorial policy.

History
Signs of the Times was first published on June 4, 1874 by James White as a weekly newspaper, making it one of the longest running, continuously published, religious subscription magazines. (A Millerite magazine of the same name had been published earlier). Signs was significant in the founding of Pacific Press.

Until April 1984 another magazine These Times was published for distribution east of the Mississippi River while Signs was distributed west of the Mississippi River.  The current magazine is a merger of These Times with Signs as of that date.

In 2007, Signs changed format to a smaller size and more pages with the change being effected in South Africa in the latter part of 2013.

See also

Signs of the Times (Australian magazine)
List of Seventh-day Adventist periodicals
Pacific Press Publishing Association
Seventh-day Adventist Church
Signs of the Times Publishing Association (Taiwan)

External links
Signs of the Times website
Signs of the Times from Adventist Archives

English-language magazines
Magazines established in 1874
Magazines published in Idaho
Monthly magazines published in the United States
Seventh-day Adventist magazines published in the United States